WZJZ (100.1 FM) is a commercial radio station licensed to Port Charlotte, Florida, and broadcasting to the Fort Myers/Southwest Florida media market.  WZJZ is owned by iHeartMedia, Inc. and airs a hot adult contemporary music format branded as "Y100.1".

The station's studios and offices are on Metro Parkway in Fort Myers.  The transmitter is off Horseshoe Road in Punta Gorda.  With a good radio, WZJZ's 84,000-watt signal can be heard from Bradenton to Lake Okeechobee to Everglades City.

WZJZ broadcasts in the HD Radio format.

History

Disco and smooth jazz
In 1976, the station first signed on at 100.1 MHz in Port Charlotte.  It had the call sign WEEJ with an effective radiated power of 3,000 watts.  It began with an all disco format.  Through most of the 1980s it had an adult contemporary format until switching formats various times through the 1990s.  In 2003, it took the callsign WCKT as "Cat Country 100."

On March 21, 2007, when it was a smooth jazz station, WZJZ moved from 107.1 FM to 100.1 FM, swapping frequencies with co-owned country music station WCKT.  WCKT is now heard at 107.1, while WZJZ continues at 100.1, with both stations getting sizable signal improvements, going from Class A to Class C.

Z100
On March 29, 2009, at midnight, WZJZ began to repeatedly play the same portion of the song "I Like To Move It" by Reel 2 Real as a stunt in preparation for a format change.  The new station was slated to be called Move 100.1. On March 30, 2009, WZJZ flipped to an upbeat rhythmic adult contemporary format and adopted the "Z100" moniker.  Its logo was patterned after its Top 40 sister stations KKRZ in Portland, Oregon, and WHTZ in New York, New York.

Y100

On July 25, 2011, after a weekend of stunting, WZJZ flipped to Top 40/CHR, using the moniker Y100, even though there is no "Y" in the call letters. The station's format and logo were patterned after its sister station in nearby Miami, WHYI, but customized for Southwest Floridians. The flip to Top 40 gave iHeartMedia two Top 40 stations in the Fort Myers market, along with rhythmic contemporary WBTT. In 2013, WZJZ once again switched its logo to match WHYI, but with some slight differences.

On March 24, 2016, at midnight, WZJZ tweaked its format to Hot AC and rebranded as "Y100.1".

Previous logo
  (WZJZ's logo under previous CHR format)

References

External links
Official Website

ZJZ
Hot adult contemporary radio stations in the United States
Radio stations established in 1976
1976 establishments in Florida
IHeartMedia radio stations